National Bank of Slovakia (NBS), is the central bank of Slovakia, a member state of the European Union since 2004 and of the eurozone since 2009. In addition to its headquarters in Bratislava, the National Bank has 5 regional offices. Until January 2009, when Slovenian adopted the euro, the bank was responsible for  former national currency, the Slovak koruna.

The National Bank is an independent institution, whose main goal is to hold price stability. On the basis of authority bestowed upon the bank by the Slovak Government, the Bank represents Slovakia in international financial institutions and in international money market transactions related to monetary policy performance. As of late 2022, the governor of the National Bank was Peter Kažimír, who took up the post on 1 June 2019.

Organization

Governing bodies
The supreme governing body of the National Bank of Slovakia is the Bank Board, which formulates monetary policy, applies appropriate instruments, and rules on monetary measures. It is composed of the Governor and a Vice-Governor,  and other three members.    Since the introduction of euro in 2009, the Governor of the NBS has been an ex-officio member of the Governing Council of the European Central Bank

Appointment
The Governor and a Vice-Governor are appointed and can be under certain circumstances dismissed by the President of Slovakia at the proposal of the Government and subject to the approval of the Slovak Parliament. The remaining three members are appointed and dismissed by the Slovak government following the proposal of the Governor. The term of appointment for bank board members is six years (five years before 1 January 2015). The number of subsequent terms is not limited for board members, but the Governor and Deputy Governor are allowed to serve only for two terms.

Governors
 Vladimír Masár, 29.07.1993 - 29.07.1999
 Marián Jusko, 30.07.1999 - 31.12.2004
 Ivan Šramko, 01.01.2005 - 11.01.2010
 Jozef Makúch, 12.01.2010 - 01.06.2019
 Peter Kažimír, Since 01.06.2019

Headquarters
The headquarters of the National Bank of Slovakia was opened on 23 May 2002 in Bratislava. At a height of 111.6 metres and with 33 floors, it is the highest non-antenna building in Bratislava.

See also

 Slovak koruna
 List of banks in Slovakia
 Economy of Slovakia

References

External links

 National Bank of Slovakia official site

Banks of Slovakia
Slovakia
Slovakia
1993 establishments in Slovakia
Banks established in 1993
Financial regulatory authorities of Slovakia